Wiatr is a surname. Notable people with the surname include:

Jerzy Wiatr (born 1931), Polish politician, sociologist, and political scientist
Kazimierz Wiatr (born 1955), Polish politician
Narcyz Wiatr (1907–1945), Polish political activist

Polish-language surnames